Facundo Bagnis won this tournament, defeating Diego Junqueira 1–6, 7–6(4), 6–0 in the final.

Seeds

Draw

Finals

Top half

Bottom half

References
 Main Draw
 Qualifying Draw

Seguros Bolivar Open Barranquilla - Singles
2011 Singles